The University for the Creative Arts is a specialist art and design university in the south of England.

It was formed in 2005 as University College for the Creative Arts at Canterbury, Epsom, Farnham, Maidstone and Rochester when the Kent Institute of Art and Design was merged into the Surrey Institute of Art & Design, which already had degree-awarding status; both constituent schools had been formed by merging the local art schools, in Kent and Surrey respectively. It was granted university status in 2008, and the name changed to the present one. In 2016, it merged with the Open College of the Arts.

History

The origin of the University for the Creative Arts lies in the establishment of various small art schools in the English counties of Kent and Surrey in the nineteenth century. In Kent the first of these was Maidstone College of Art, founded in 1867, and in Surrey the Guildford School of Art, founded in 1856. During the second half of the twentieth century many of these small art schools merged, eventually forming Kent Institute of Art & Design in 1987, and Surrey Institute of Art & Design in 1995. These two organisations joined forces in 2005 to become the University College for the Creative Arts at Canterbury, Epsom, Farnham, Maidstone and Rochester.  In May 2008 the University College for Creative Arts was granted full university status by the Privy Council, and adopted its current name, the University for the Creative Arts, officially in September 2008.

Following the election of a Coalition government, the Department for Business Innovation and Skills introduced legislation to increase tuition fees while reducing government spending on Higher Education in real terms and the University for the Creative Arts was revealed to be the fourth most-cut university in England with a cut of 7.8% (10.2% in real terms).

The University for the Creative Arts announced in February 2011 that it was discussing designating part of its Maidstone campus for use by MidKent College. Further to this, MidKent College expressed its willingness to buy the Maidstone campus from 2012 and phase out the UCA presence at the campus by 2014.

Timeline
 1856 – Guildford School of Art is founded as Guildford Working Men's Institution
 1866 – Farnham School of Art is founded 
 1867 – Maidstone College of Art is founded as Maidstone School of Art
 1868 – Canterbury College of Art is founded as the Sidney Cooper School of Art
 1886 – Medway College of Design is founded as Rochester School of Art
 1896 – Epsom School of Art & Design is founded as Epsom Technical Institute & School of Art
 1969 – Farnham School of Art and Guildford School of Art merge to form West Surrey College of Art & Design
 1987 – Canterbury College of Art, Maidstone College of Art and Medway College of Design merge to form Kent Institute of Art & Design
 1995 – Epsom School of Art & Design and West Surrey College of Art & Design merge to form Surrey Institute of Art & Design 
 1999 – Surrey Institute of Art & Design receives University College Title from the Privy Council and is renamed Surrey Institute of Art & Design, University College 
 2005 – Kent Institute of Art & Design and Surrey Institute of Art & Design, University College merge to form University College for the Creative Arts at Canterbury, Epsom, Farnham, Maidstone & Rochester 
 2008 – University College for the Creative Arts at Canterbury, Epsom, Farnham, Maidstone & Rochester receives University Title from the Privy Council and is renamed University for the Creative Arts

Campuses

UCA has campuses in Canterbury, Epsom, Farnham and Rochester, together with teaching bases at the Royal School of Needlework and The Maidstone Studios, and a project and exhibition space in Folkestone Creative Quarter. It previously had a campus in Maidstone, which was closed in 2014.

The university also validates provision at, or co-delivers courses with, a number of other educational institutions and arts organisations in the UK and overseas: Farnham Maltings, Laine Theatre Arts, London School of Design & Marketing,  Millennium  Performing Arts, Turner Contemporary and MIT Institute of Design.

On 1 November 2016, the Open College of the Arts became part of UCA. This built on a close working relationship established in 2010.

Organisation and academic life

, and offers courses in a very wide range of architecture, art, design, fashion, media and performing arts subjects. Courses are offered at pre-degree further education, undergraduate, taught postgraduate and doctoral levels.

The University is organised into seven academic schools: The Business School, Canterbury School of Architecture; Crafts & Design; Fashion and Textiles; Film, Media & Performing Arts; Fine Art, Photography and Visual Communication; and Further Education.

It has five research centres: Centre for Digital Scholarship, Centre for Sustainable Design, Crafts Study Centre, Fine Art & Photography Research Centre, and International Textile Research Centre.

The UK's first Business School for the Creative Industries is based at UCA Epsom.

Rankings and reputation

Chancellor
 2010 – Zandra Rhodes
 2018 – Magdalene Odundo

Pro-Chancellors / Chairs of the Board of Governors
 2008 – Loyd Grossman
 2012 – Robert Taylor

Vice-Chancellors
 2005 – Elaine Thomas
 2011 – Simon Ofield-Kerr
 2017 – Alan Cooke (Acting)
 2017 – Bashir Makhoul

Notable alumni 

William McGregor, film and television director, directed programmes such as Poldark and Misfits
PJ Liguori, YouTube filmmaker
Chris Butler,  storyboard artist, writer and director, known for his works at Laika, such as ParaNorman
 Edd Gould, animator, artist, writer director, voice actor and creator of Eddsworld

See also
 Armorial of UK universities
 List of art universities and colleges in Europe
 List of universities in the UK
 Visual arts education

References

External links

 
Education in Canterbury
Education in Medway
University for the Creative Arts
University for the Creative Arts
University for the Creative Arts
University for the Creative Arts
Fashion schools in the United Kingdom
Design schools in the United Kingdom
2005 establishments in England
Educational institutions established in 2005
Universities and colleges formed by merger in the United Kingdom